Sutton Lane Meadows is a 3.44 hectare biological Site of Special Scientific Interest in Wiltshire, notified in 1988.

Sources

 English Nature citation sheet for the site (accessed 11 August 2006)

External links
 English Nature website (SSSI information)

Sites of Special Scientific Interest in Wiltshire
Sites of Special Scientific Interest notified in 1988
Meadows in Wiltshire